The President pro tempore of the North Carolina Senate (more commonly, "Pro-Tem") is the highest-ranking (internally elected) officer of one house of the North Carolina General Assembly. The President of the Senate is the Lieutenant Governor of North Carolina, but the President pro tempore actually holds most of the power and presides in the absence of the Lt. Governor. The President pro tempore, a senior member of the party with a majority of seats, appoints senators to committees and also appoints certain members of state boards and commissions.  From 1777 to 1868, North Carolina had no Lieutenant Governor, and the highest-ranking officer of the Senate was known as the "Speaker".  The Speaker of the Senate was next in line if the office of Governor became vacant. This occurred on two occasions.

Presidents pro tempore are elected at the beginning of each biennial session, currently in January of odd-numbered years. Between 1868 and 1992, it was rare for a President pro tempore to serve more than two terms. Marc Basnight, however, became arguably the most powerful North Carolina Senate leader in history and one of the state's most influential politicians when he served a record nearly 18 years as President pro tempore.

History 
Upon Republican Jim Gardner's assumption of lieutenant gubernatorial office in 1989, Democrats in the Senate modified the body's rules, transferring the powers to appoint committees and assign bills away from the lieutenant governor and to the president pro tempore. This dramatically increased the influence of the latter position.

Powers and duties 
The president pro tempore is responsible for appointing the members of the Senate's committees at the opening of each legislative session. They also have the power to appoint some members of state executive boards.

North Carolina Senate presiding officers

Speakers

The following members were elected speakers of the Senate:
Samuel Ashe 1777
Whitmell Hill 1778
Allen Jones 1778–1779
Abner Nash 1779–1780
Alexander Martin 1780–1782
Richard Caswell 1782–1784
Alexander Martin 1785
James Coor 1786–1787
Alexander Martin 1787–1788
Richard Caswell 1789
Charles Johnson 1789
William Lenoir 1790–1795
Benjamin Smith 1795–1799
Joseph Riddick 1800–1804
Alexander Martin 1805
Joseph Riddick 1806–1811
George Outlaw 1812–1814
John Branch 1815–1817
Bartlett Yancey 1817–1828
Jesse Speight 1828–1829
Bedford Brown 1829–1830
David F. Caldwell 1830–1832
William D. Moseley 1832–1835
Hugh Waddell (Whig) 1836–1837 
Andrew Joyner 1838–1841
Louis Dicken Wilson 1842–1843
Burgess S. Gaither 1844–1845
Andrew Joyner 1846–1847
Calvin Graves 1848–1849
Andrew Joyner 1849
Weldon N. Edwards 1850–1852
Warren Winslow 1854–1855
William Waightstill Avery 1856–1857
Henry Toole Clark 1858–1861
Giles Mebane 1862–1865
Thomas Settle 1865–1866
C. S. Winstead 1866
Matthias Manly 1866
Joseph Harvey Wilson 1867

Presidents pro tempore

The following members were elected President pro tempore of the Senate:
Charles S. Winstead 1868–1869
Edward Jenner Warren (D) 1870–1872
James Turner Morehead Jr. 1872–1875 
James L. Robinson (D) 1876–1877
William A. Graham (D) 1879–1880
William T. Dortch (D) 1881–1883
Edwin T. Boykin 1885–1887
Edwin W. Kerr (D) 1889
W. D. Turner (D) 1891
John L. King 1893
E. L. Franck Jr. (P) 1895–1897
R. L. Smith (D) 1899–1900
F. A. Whitaker (D) 1899—1900
Henry A. London (D) 1901–1903
Charles A. Webb (D) 1905–1908
Whitehead Klutz (D) 1909
Henry N. Pharr (D) 1911–1913
Oliver Max Gardner (D) 1915
Fordyce C. Harding (D) 1917
Lindsay C. Warren (D) 1919–1920
William L. Long (D) 1921–1924
William H. S. Burgwyn (D) 1925
William L. Long (D) 1927
Thomas L. Johnson (D) 1929
Rivers D. Johnson (D) 1931
William G. Clark (D) 1933
Paul D. Grady (D) 1935
Andrew H. Johnston (D) 1937–1938
James A. Bell (D) 1937–1938
Whitman E. Smith (D) 1939
John Davis Larkins Jr. (D) 1941
John H. Price (D) 1943
Archie C. Gay (D) 1945
Joseph L. Blythe (D) 1947
James C. Pittman (D) 1949
Rufus G. Rankin (D) 1951
Edwin Pate (D) 1953
Paul E. Jones (D) 1955–1956
Claude Currie (D) 1957
Robert F. Morgan (D) 1959
William L. Crew (D) 1961
Ralph H. Scott (D) 1963 
Robert B. Morgan (D) 1965–1966
Herman A. Moore (D) 1967
Neill H. McGeachy (D) 1969
Frank N. Patterson Jr. (D) 1971
Gordon P. Allen (D) 1971–1974
John T. Henley (D) 1975–1978
W. Craig Lawing (D) 1979–1984
J. J. Harrington (D) 1985–1988
Henson P. Barnes (D) 1989–1992
Marc Basnight (D) 1993–2010
Phil Berger (R) 2011–present

See also
Speaker of the North Carolina House of Representatives

References

Structure of the North Carolina General Assembly
North Carolina Manual, published by the North Carolina Secretary of State

Works cited 
 

North Carolina Senate
Lists of North Carolina politicians
Political history of North Carolina